KKHQ-FM (98.5 MHz), branded as Q98-5, is a radio station serving Waterloo, Cedar Falls, and surrounding cities with a Top 40/CHR format. This station is owned by Townsquare Media.

On August 30, 2013, a deal was announced in which Townsquare Media would acquire 53 Cumulus stations, including the then-KOEL-FM, for $238 million. The deal was part of Cumulus' acquisition of Dial Global; Townsquare and Dial Global are both controlled by Oaktree Capital Management. The sale to Townsquare was completed on November 14, 2013; KOEL-FM was one of three stations (along with KCRR and KKHQ-FM) that were placed in a divestiture trust for eventual resale within two years. In December 2016, the Federal Communications Commission approved Townsquare's request to reacquire the stations from the divestiture trust.

On December 9, 2020, KOEL-FM and KKHQ-FM swapped frequencies, bringing the KOEL-FM call letters and the country format back to 92.3 FM after 17 years. In return, KKHQ-FM's Top 40/CHR format moved to 98.5 and rebranded as "Q98.5".

References

External links
Q98.5 - Official website

Contemporary hit radio stations in the United States
Cedar Falls, Iowa
Radio stations established in 1994
KHQ-FM
Townsquare Media radio stations
1994 establishments in Iowa